Işık Menküer (born 21 December 1964) is a Turkish volleyball coach. He has coached many teams including

External links
 Coach profile at WorldofVolley.com 
 Coach profile at Volleybox.net

1964 births
Living people
People from Antalya
Turkish volleyball coaches
Turkish men's volleyball players
Volleyball coaches of international teams
Galatasaray S.K. (men's volleyball) coaches